The Cells Alive System (CAS) is a line of commercial freezers manufactured by ABI Corporation, Ltd. of Chiba, Japan claimed to preserve food with greater freshness than ordinary freezing by using electromagnetic fields and mechanical vibrations to limit ice crystal formation that destroys food texture. They also are claimed to increase tissue survival without having its water replaced by cryogenically compatible fluids; whether they have any effect is unclear. The freezers have attracted attention among organ banking and transplantation surgeons, as well as the food processing industry.

References

External links 
 ABI Corporation's CAS product line at Alibaba.com

Cooling technology
Cryobiology
Emerging technologies